Kemp is an unincorporated community in Allen County, in the U.S. state of Ohio.

History
A variant name was Kempton. Kemp originally was the name of the community's railroad station. A post office called Kempton was established in 1882, and remained in operation until 1931.

References

Unincorporated communities in Allen County, Ohio
1882 establishments in Ohio
Populated places established in 1882
Unincorporated communities in Ohio